Keechelus Lake is a lake and reservoir in the northwest United States, near Hyak in Kittitas County, Washington.

Keechelus Lake is the westernmost of three large lakes near Interstate 90 and north of the Yakima River in the Cascade Range; the other two are Kachess Lake in the middle and Cle Elum Lake to the east. Its westbound lanes included a snowshed midway (milepost 57.7); built in 1950 for U.S. Route 10, it was removed in April 2014.

Keechelus Lake is part of the Columbia River basin, being the source of the Yakima River, which is tributary to the Columbia River.

The lake is used as a storage reservoir for the Yakima Project, an irrigation project run by the United States Bureau of Reclamation.

The name Keechelus comes from a Native American term meaning "few fish", in contrast to Kachess Lake, whose name means "more fish".

The Chicago, Milwaukee, St. Paul and Pacific Railroad ("Milwaukee Road") formerly ran along the west shore of the lake and crossed the Cascades through the 2¼-mile (3.6 km) Snoqualmie Tunnel, with its east portal at Hyak. Close to the east portal near the lake's northwest shore was the Milwaukee Ski Bowl, built in 1937 and operated by the railroad until 1950.

The Milwaukee Road went through several bankruptcies; its rails were abandoned in 1980 and the right-of-way is now a rail trail, Iron Horse State Park, which includes the tunnel.

About two miles (3 km) south of Keechelus Lake, the Northern Pacific Railway crossed the Cascades at Stampede Pass, and later through the associated tunnel, which opened  in 1888. This route is still in use by NP's successor, BNSF Railway.  It also had a ski area, the Martin Ski Dome.

See also
List of dams in the Columbia River watershed
The Summit at Snoqualmie
Hyak, Washington
Milwaukee Ski Bowl
Martin, Washington
Martin Ski Dome
Baker Lake, on a cirque of Keechelus Ridge

References

External links

Keechelus Dam, United States Bureau of Reclamation
, USGS, GNIS
Historic American Engineering Record (HAER) documentation, filed under Easton, Kittitas County, WA:

Reservoirs in Washington (state)
Lakes of Washington (state)
Lakes of Kittitas County, Washington
Protected areas of Kittitas County, Washington
Wenatchee National Forest
Historic American Engineering Record in Washington (state)
Tributaries of the Yakima River